The Culture of Scandinavia encompasses the cultures of the Scandinavia region Northern Europe including Denmark, Norway, and Sweden, and may  also include the Nordic countries Finland, Iceland, and the Faroe Islands.

National cultures within Scandinavia include:

Culture of Sweden
Culture of Norway
Culture of Denmark
Culture of Iceland
Culture of Faroe Islands
Culture of Finland

See also
Culture of Europe
Cultural policies of the European Union
History of Scandinavia